The 2018–19 season is FC Twente's second visit to the Eerste Divisie following their relegation from the 2017–18 Eredivisie. It marks their return to the second highest division in Dutch football after spending 34 consecutive seasons in the top flight of Dutch football. Marino Pusic was promoted to head coach after filling in as interim manager after the departure of Gertjan Verbeek during the 2017–18 season.

FC Twente were confirmed as champions of the 2018–19 Eerste Divisie season on 22 April 2019, finishing top of the Netherlands' second-highest tier of football for the first time in the club's history.

Season review

Pre-season 
FC Twente's pre-season got off to a rocky start. Following the relegation to the Eerste Divisie, the club was forced to slash spending after reducing the overall budget from 30 million to 18 million euros. In late June it became apparent that FC Twente was in dire need of financial help, leaving the club in great uncertainty about the future. The club even threatened to file for bankruptcy if the Enschede city council does not stand guarantee for 7 million euros. A few weeks later FC Twente announced it staved off bankruptcy after the city council agreed to a rescue plan.
City officials agreed to freeze interest and repayments of a loan made to the club over a two-season period. In addition, some 30 of the club's sponsors have agreed to invest 10 million euros in the club.

On 31 May, FC Twente announced their first signing of the summer; the return of Dutch midfielder Wout Brama from Australian side  Central Coast Mariners, signing him on a free transfer. Brama previously played at Twente between 2005 and 2014 where he won the Eredivisie in 2010.

First team

Transfers and loans

Summer

Transfers in

Loans in

Transfers out

Winter

Loans in

Loans out

New contracts

Friendlies
FC Twente revealed pre-season fixtures against  Heerenveen, FC Emmen, VVV-Venlo, Göztepe S.K. and Al-Taawoun.

Pre-season

Competitions

Overview

Goalscorers

References

FC Twente seasons
Dutch football clubs 2018–19 season